Samuel Parkes may refer to:

 Samuel Parkes (chemist) (c. 1759–1825), British manufacturing chemist
 Samuel Parkes (VC) (c. 1815–1864), British soldier and recipient of the Victoria Cross

See also
Samuel Parks (disambiguation)
Samuel Parker (disambiguation)